Alejandro Agustín Domenez (born 25 February 1987) is an Argentine football midfielder currently playing for Gimnasia y Esgrima.

Domenez made his league debut in a 3–1 defeat by Arsenal de Sarandí on 5 August 2006. In 2007, he was loaned to Almagro of the Argentine 2nd division. Since his return to Gimnasia in 2008 he has failed to return to first team football.

 Argentine Primera statistics

1987 births
Living people
People from Tandil
Argentine footballers
Association football midfielders
Club de Gimnasia y Esgrima La Plata footballers
Club Almagro players
Sportspeople from Buenos Aires Province